Fish vary greatly in size. The whale shark and basking shark exceed all other fish by a considerable margin in weight and length. Fish are a paraphyletic group that describes aquatic vertebrates while excluding tetrapods, and the bony fish that often represent the group are more closely related to cetaceans such as whales, than to the cartilaginous fish such as sharks and rays. As such, cross group comparisons on this page only serve a colloquial purpose.

Largest extant fish

Jawless fish (Agnatha) 

 Hagfish (Myxini)
The hagfish, which are not taxonomically true fish, are among the most primitive extant vertebrates. There is only one order and family in this animal class. All of the 77 known species have elongated, eel-like bodies but can be distinguished by their downward-facing mouths. The largest form is the Goliath hagfish (Eptatretus goliath).

 Lampreys (Petromyzontiformes)

As with the hagfish, lampreys appear eel-like in shape. They have cartilaginous skeletons and have been evolving separately from any other group for over 400 million years. They are predatory and often attach themselves to a fish or other small animal and gradually drain blood and organs.

Armored fish (Placodermi) 

The largest fish of the now-extinct class Placodermi was the giant predatory Dunkleosteus. Its filter feeding relative, Titanichthys, may have rivaled it in size.

Cartilaginous fish (Chondrichthyes) 

The cartilaginous fish are not directly related to the "bony fish," but are sometimes lumped together for simplicity in description. The largest living cartilaginous fish, of the order Orectolobiformes, is the whale shark (Rhincodon typus), of the world's tropical oceans. It is also the largest living animal that is not a cetacean and, like the largest whales, it is a docile creature that filter-feeds on tiny plankton.

 Ground sharks (Carcharhiniformes)

The largest species of this order is the widely distributed tiger shark (Galeocerdo cuvier). Specimens have been verified to at least  but even larger ones have been reported. A female caught in 1957 reportedly measured  and weighing , although this very outsized shark is not known to have been confirmed. The largest hammerhead shark is the great hammerhead (Sphyrna mokarran), which can reach  and weigh . The most species-rich shark family, the catsharks, are fairly small-bodied.

 Chimaeras (Chimaeriformes)
These odd, often translucent cartilaginous fish are typically quite small. The largest species is the carpenter's chimaera (Chimaera lignaria) of the oceans near Australia and New Zealand.

 Frill sharks and cow sharks (Hexanchiformes)
The largest frill sharks and cow shark is the Bluntnose sixgill shark (Hexanchus griseus).

 Bullhead sharks (Heterodontiformes)
These tropical, small sharks are noted for their broad head shape.

 Mackerel sharks (Lamniformes)

Most species in this order grow quite large. The largest living species is the basking shark (Cetorhinus maximus) of the world's northern temperate oceans, also the second largest fish. Perhaps the most famous "big fish" is the great white shark (Carcharodon carcharias).

The largest shark in the fossil record is the megalodon (Otodus megalodon), a colossal Neogene lamniform. It is also regarded as the largest macro-predatory fish ever.

 Stingrays and allies (Myliobatiformes)

Both the largest species of this order and the largest of all rays is the giant oceanic manta ray (Manta birostris). A related species reaches barely smaller sizes, the devil fish (Mobula mobular). Although there are several large stingrays that at least approach this species' size.

 Carpet sharks (Orectolobiformes)
The whale shark is the largest species in this order, reaching up to 20 meters long when fully mature. No other species in the order even approaches this size.
 Sawfish (Pristiformes)
Distinguished by a long snout decorated with sharp teeth on the sides, these little-known cartilaginous fish are often reported to attain huge sizes. The definitive largest species is not known, although the smalltooth sawfish (Pristis pectinata) and the green sawfish (P. zijsron), at up to reportedly , respectively, may be the largest. Weights of up to  have been reported, possibly for the smalltooth species, but are not verified. The large-tooth sawfish (P. pristis) and freshwater sawfish (P. microdon) can both exceed .

 Sawsharks (Pristiophoriformes)
Despite sharing a similar appearing snout adapted in both to shred fish prey, the sawsharks are typically much smaller than sawfish.

 Skates and allies (Rajiformes)

The largest and most diverse order of rays' largest species is the giant guitarfish (Rhynchobatus djiddensis) of the Red Sea and the eastern Indian ocean. The largest of the skates is the common skate (Dipturus batis).

 Dogfish and allies (Squaliformes)
The largest known member of this order is the Greenland shark (Somniosus microcephalus), a giant predator of sub-Arctic waters. The spiny dogfish (Squalus acanthias), a very common species, reaches the largest sizes of the "true dogfish" family.

 Angelsharks (Squatiniformes)
The largest of the bottom-dwelling angelsharks (named for their shape rather than disposition) is the common angelshark (Squatina squatina) of the northeast Atlantic ocean.

 Electric rays (Torpediniformes)
The largest of the electric rays is Atlantic torpedo (Torpedo nobiliana). Females attain a larger size than males.

Spiny sharks (Acanthodii) 

The largest of the now-extinct Acanthodii was Xylacanthus grandis, an ischnacanthiform based on a ~ long jaw bone.

Bony fish (Osteichthyes)

Ray-finned fish (Actinopterygii) 

The largest verified specimen belongs to the southern sunfish discovered dead near the Azores in the Atlantic has set the record for being the largest extant bony fish with the weight of 2744 kg (6049 lb).

As for length, the longest extant bony fish on earth is the giant oarfish (Regalecus glesne).

Much larger bony fish existed prehistorically, the largest ever known having been Leedsichthys of the Jurassic period. This species is certainly the largest bony fish ever and perhaps the largest non-cetacean marine animal to have ever existed.

 Sturgeons and paddlefishes (Acipenseriformes)

The largest species is the beluga sturgeon (Huso huso) of the Caspian and Black seas, the only extant bony fish to rival the massiveness of the ocean sunfish. Atlantics and Baikal sturgeons are following as well. These fish are sometimes called the largest freshwater fish but sturgeons spend a great deal of time in brackish water and switch back and forth between saltwater and freshwater environments in their life cycle. Also included in this order are the paddlefish and the Chinese paddlefish (Psephurus gladius), which is now officially recognised as extinct by the IUCN (as of July 2022), is also a very large fish. The weight of the Chinese paddlefish is reportedly .

 Bonefish (Albuliformes)
It is silvery in color with dusky fins. The bases of the pectoral fins are yellow.

 Bowfins (Amiiformes)
The bowfin (Amia calva) is the sole member of its order. The most distinctive characteristic of the bowfin is its very long dorsal fin consisting of 145 to 250 rays, and running from mid-back to the base of the tail. The caudal fin is a single lobe, though heterocercal.

 Eels (Anguilliformes)

The largest species of "true eel," if measured in weight and overall bulk, is the European conger (Conger conger). Several moray eels can equal or exceed the previous eel in length but do not weigh as much.

 Silversides (Atheriniformes)
An order best known for its tiny representatives, the largest species is the jacksmelt (Atherinopsis californiensis) of the Pacific Ocean. Although it reaches , it is not known to even reach .

 Barreleyes, slickheads and argentines (Argentiniformes)
The largest species is the greater argentine (Argentina silus), that has  TL.
This species grows to a length of  SL.

 Jellynose fishes (Ateleopodiformes)
The largest jellynose fishes is Ateleopus japonicus is an exception, retaining several fins as adults and having ventral fins that are located behind (not below) the pectoral fins. Dorsal fins tend to be high, with a rather short base (9-13 rays, but in some as few as three); they are placed just behind the head. They have seven branchiostegal rays. The species have a range of sizes, the longest reaching .

 Grinners (Aulopiformes)
The largest member of this order is the lancetfish (Alepisaurus ferox), found in all the world's oceans.

 Toadfish (Batrachoidiformes)

 Flying-fish and allies (Beloniformes)

 Squirrelfish (Beryciformes)

 Whalefish (Cetomimiformes)
Known for flesh that feels flabby to the touch, this order reaches largest sizes in the flabby whalefish (Gyrinomimus grahami) of all southern oceans.

 Characins (Characiformes)
The largest species is the African freshwater fish, the giant tigerfish (Hydrocynus goliath). Among the characins are the infamous neotropical piranhas.

 Herring (Clupeiformes)
The largest herring is probably the Dorab wolf herring (Chirocentrus dorab) of the Indo-Pacific oceans. The so-called "king of herrings" is not a herring, but an oarfish.

 Minnows and allies (Cypriniformes)
The minnow family (which includes carp), Cyprinidae, is the largest family of vertebrates, with over 2400 species known today. In centuries past, mahseer, specifically the golden mahseer (Tor putitora) of Southern Asia was reported to reach similar lengths, but the species has been overfished and specimens nearly as large as the giant barb have not been reported in recent centuries.
Pikes and allies (Esociformes)
The largest species in this small but interesting order (formerly allied with the salmonids) is the muskellunge (Esox masquinongy) of the rivers of North America.

 Killifish and allies (Cyprinodontiformes)

Ladyfish and allies (Elopiformes)
This small order is usually considered closely related to the true eels although its members are very different in appearance and behavior from eels. The largest species is much-coveted-sport fish, the Atlantic tarpon (Megalops atlanticus).

 Cod (Gadiformes)

 Sticklebacks and allies (Gasterosteiformes)
The largest form of stickleback, a small, cylindric type of fish, is the sea stickleback or fifteenspine stickleback (Spinachia spinachia).

 Clingfish (Gobiesociformes)
These bottom-dwelling fish reach their maximum size in Sicyases sanguineus.

 Shellears and allies (Gonorynchiformes)
The well-known milkfish (Chanos chanos) is the largest member of this order.

 Knifefish (Gymnotiformes)

 Mooneyes (Hiodontiformes)
Only two extant species are known to exist in this relatively new order.

 Ribbonfish and allies (Lampriformes)
The largest member of this small but fascinating order is the aforementioned king of herrings or oarfish (Regalecus glesne), the longest extant bony fish on earth. Another interesting big fish in this order is the opah (Lampris guttatus), which as opposed to the king of herrings, is massive and has a chunky, rounded shape.

 Gars (Lepisosteiformes)

The largest of the gar, and the largest entirely freshwater fish in North America, is the alligator gar (Atractosteus spatula).

 Anglerfish (Lophiiformes)
The largest of this diverse order is the common goosefish (Lophius piscatorius) found in the northeastern Atlantic off Europe and North Africa.

 Lanternfish (Myctophiformes)

 Mullets (Mugiliformes)
The largest of mullets flathead mullet (Mugil cephalus) have dark centers which give the appearance of a series (6-7) of dark horizontal stripes.

 Pearlfish and allies (Ophidiiformes)
The largest member of this order is the widely distributed giant cusk-eels (Lamprogrammus shcherbachevi).

 Smelts and allies (Osmeriformes)
The largest smelt is the rainbow smelt (Osmerus mordax). The body of the rainbow smelt is slender and cylindrical.

 Bony-tongued fish (Osteoglossiformes)
The largest species is the South American fish usually known as the arapaima (Arapaima gigas). The maximum size this species can attain is a matter of some controversy and some rank it among the world's largest freshwater fishes. No individual arapaima over  has been verified and measured.

 Perches and allies (Perciformes)

The title of the largest member of this order, the most numerous order of all vertebrates, is a matter of some debate. A large marlin is the biggest of these fishes: the black marlin (Makaira indica) of the Indo-Pacific, the Atlantic blue marlin (Makaira nigricans) and the Indo-Pacific blue marlin (Makaira mazara). Due to heavy fishing of both species, swordfish and tuna of great sizes are increasingly rare. Among the sea bass or groupers, many of which can grow quite large, the greatest size are reached in the Atlantic goliath grouper (Epinephelus itajara) and the giant grouper (Epinephelus lanceolatus).

 Trout-perch and allies (Percopsiformes)
The largest species in this small order (both by number of species and body size) is the sand roller (Percopsis transmontana) of North America.

 Flatfish (Pleuronectiformes)

The largest of the well-known and heavily fished flatfish is the Pacific halibut (Hippoglossus stenolepis).

 Beardfish (Polymixiiformes)
The little-known beardfish are sometimes classified with the Beryciformes.

 Polypterids and allies (Polypteriformes)

 Gulper eels (Saccopharyngiformes)
The largest gulper eel is the pelican eel (Eurypharynx pelecanoides).

 Salmon and allies (Salmoniformes)

The largest species of salmonid is the taimen (Hucho taimen). Some sources claim the largest is the Chinook salmon (Oncorhynchus tshawytscha) of America's Pacific Northwest, although this species falls behind the taimen in maximum size.

 Sculpins (Scorpaeniformes)
Although less venomous than many smaller fish in the same order, the skilfish (Erilepis zonifer) of the North Pacific, is largest sculpin.

 Catfish (Siluriformes)

Most authorities now give the crown of the largest catfish to the Mekong giant catfish, Pangasianodon gigas, which is also considered the heaviest completely freshwater fish. Another large species is the wels catfish (Silurus glanis) of Europe and Central Asia, which strongly rivals the proceeding species in weight and could possibly surpass them in length.

 Ridgeheads and allies (Stephanoberyciformes)
The largest ridgeheads Poromitra curilensis, a Pacific ridgehead related to the crested bigscale, at up to 18 centimetres standard length (SL; a measurement excluding the caudal fin). Most ridgeheads are well under 10 centimetres SL.

 Bristlemouths (Stomiiformes)

The largest of the deep-sea bristlemouths is the short-tailed barbeled dragonfish (Oppostomias micripnus). Although Idiacanthus is much more slender and is lighter than Oppostomias.

 Swamp-eels (Synbranchiformes)
The tropic-dwelling swamp-eels, which are not closely related to true eels, reaches their largest size in the marbled swamp eel (Synbrachus marmoratus) of Central and South America.

 Seahorses and allies (Syngnathiformes)
The largest of this diverse order is the red cornetfish (Fistularia petimba), a long, thin species found in all tropical oceans.

 Pufferfishes and allies (Tetraodontiformes)
The largest freshwater pufferfish is the mbu pufferfish (Tetraodon mbu) from the Congo river basin. As such, these fish are difficult to adequately house in captivity since they require a very large aquarium and appropriately scaled water filtration.

 Dories (Zeiformes)

Lobe-finned fish (Sarcopterygii) 

The largest living lobe-finned fish is the coelacanth.

 Lungfish (Dipnoi)
The largest lungfish, the African lungfish (Protopterus aethiopicus), is smooth, elongated, and cylindrical with deeply embedded scales. The tail is very long and tapers at the end. The pectoral and pelvic fins are also very long and thin, almost spaghetti-like.

See also
 Megafauna
 List of longest fish
 Largest organisms
 Largest prehistoric animals

References 

Fish
Largest
Heaviest or most massive organisms